Pål Varhaug (born 26 January 1991 in Stavanger) is a professional racing driver from Norway.

Career

Karting
Varhaug began his motorsport career in karting in 2005, finishing fifth in the Norwegian Championship ICA Junior category. He also finished fourth in the Viking Trophy ICA Junior class. The following year he won the Norwegian Championship ICA Junior title.

Formula Renault 2.0
Varhaug moved up to single–seaters in 2007, competing in the Swiss Formula Renault 2.0 championship for Jenzer Motorsport. Over the course of the season he took seven podium places, including four race wins, to finish as runner-up in the championship. He also took part in selected races in both the Italian Formula Renault 2.0 and Formula Renault 2.0 NEC championships.

Varhaug continued with Jenzer Motorsport in the category for 2008, racing full seasons in both the Eurocup Formula Renault 2.0 and Italian Formula Renault 2.0 series. He finished fifteenth in the Eurocup standings, with his best race result being a fifth place in the second event at Estoril. In the Italian series, he finished in the points in all fourteen races and took three races wins to comfortably win the title.

At the end of the season, Varhaug took part in Formula Renault 3.5 Series testing at Paul Ricard with the Italian Prema Powerteam, completing over one hundred laps in the process.

International Formula Master
For 2009, Varhaug moved up to the International Formula Master series, once again staying with Jenzer Motorsport. He finished in fifth place in the standings, and was the runner–up in the rookie classification behind Alexander Rossi. He achieved five podium places and a pole position at Brno.

GP3 Series
Varhaug graduated to the new GP3 Series with Jenzer Motorsport in 2010. After qualifying on the front row of the grid for the opening race of the season in Barcelona, Varhaug became the first–ever GP3 race winner, finishing ahead of both Robert Wickens and Esteban Gutiérrez. He failed to score another point after his win and eventually finished 13th in the standings.

Varhaug originally finished in third place in the feature race at Spa–Francorchamps, but was later demoted to 15th after overtaking the safety car. He also posted the fastest lap in the final race of the season in Monza, but was not rewarded with a championship point because he failed to finish inside the race's top ten positions.

GP2 Series
Varhaug graduated to the GP2 Series for 2011, driving alongside Romain Grosjean in the DAMS team. He finished thirteenth in the Asia series, which along his team-mate's overall victory, allowed DAMS to win the teams' championship. Whilst Grosjean also won the main series championship, Varhuag did not score any points and was classified 23rd overall.

Auto GP World Series
After losing his GP2 drive at DAMS, Varhaug moved to the Auto GP World Series with the Virtuosi UK team.

Racing record

Career summary

Complete GP3 Series results
(key) (Races in bold indicate pole position) (Races in italics indicate fastest lap)

Complete GP2 Series results
(key) (Races in bold indicate pole position) (Races in italics indicate fastest lap)

Complete GP2 Asia Series results
(key) (Races in bold indicate pole position) (Races in italics indicate fastest lap)

Complete Auto GP World Series results
(key) (Races in bold indicate pole position) (Races in italics indicate fastest lap)

References

External links
 
 

1991 births
Living people
Sportspeople from Stavanger
Norwegian racing drivers
Formula Renault 2.0 NEC drivers
Formula Renault 2.0 Alps drivers
Italian Formula Renault 2.0 drivers
Formula Renault Eurocup drivers
International Formula Master drivers
GP3 Series drivers
GP2 Asia Series drivers
GP2 Series drivers
Auto GP drivers
Jenzer Motorsport drivers
DAMS drivers
Virtuosi Racing drivers
Hilmer Motorsport drivers